Disentis (German) or Mustér (Romansh), with its official name Disentis/Mustér is a village and a municipality in the Surselva Region in the Swiss canton of Graubünden.

The skiing and summer tourism resort high up in the Rhine valley is the site of one of the oldest Benedictine monasteries in Switzerland. The monastery dates back to 720, its huge actual complex dates from 1696 to 1712.

History

Disentis is first mentioned in 765  as Desertina. In 1127 it was mentioned as monasterium Dissertinensis.  The name Disentis is supposed to come from Latin Desertina, used for the deserted valley in late antique times, while the Romansh name Mustér refers to the monastery.

Disentis Abbey, founded in ca. 720, was already in early medieval times the cultural and political center of the later Grisons. Situated on the road to the Lukmanier pass used by the German emperors on their way to Italy, Disentis became a place of international importance in the high Middle Ages and the prince abbot of Disentis was the lord of the Rhine valley. In the later Middle Ages, the farmer communities in the valleys became stronger and the influence of the monastery decreased, but the abbot of Disentis still played an important role in the founding of the Grey League in 1395.

When the Grey League became a formal ally of the Swiss Confederation in 1497, Disentis, at the foot of the Oberalp pass which was the nearest connection to the confederation, was again in a strategically important situation, but later on it was overtaken in importance by the larger Ilanz.

Geography

Of this area, 21.8% is used for agricultural purposes, while 22% is forested. Of the rest of the land, 1.8% is settled (buildings or roads) and the remainder (54.3%) is non-productive (rivers, glaciers or mountains).

Before 2017, the municipality was located in the Disentis sub-district of the Surselva district (which was, until the end of 2000, the Vorderrhein district). It is the largest of the seven municipalities that make up the Disentis sub-district and is the capital. It consists of the center village of Mustér-Vitg and the neighboring villages of Mompé-Tujetsch, Segnes, Acletta, Funs/Clavaniev, Disla, Cavardiras and Mompé-Medel. Except for the two Mompé villages, all the villages contain multiple scattered settlements. The settlement of Brulf near Disentis village was covered in a rockslide in 1689. Until 1963 Disentis/Mustér was known as Disentis/Mustèr.

Disentis lies on the highest step of the Rhine valley, where the roads of the Oberalp pass coming from central and western Switzerland and of the Lukmanier pass coming from the Ticino meet. It has a station where the line from Brig meets the line from Chur and is connected by train and road to the Valais via the Oberalp pass and to Chur following the Rhine valley. The Lukmanier pass road is in summer served by a post bus line.

Culture 
Most of the population speaks Romansh (75.3%), with German being second most common (20.4%) and Portuguese third (1.4%).  The official language of the municipality is the Sursilvan dialect of Romansh. While Swiss German and German are spoken by most people as second and third languages respectively, the local laws are only in Romansh.

Disentis is one of the most important centers of the Romansh language, especially of its Sursilvan dialect. It also plays an important role as cultural center through the high school of the monastery.

Tourism 

For alpine skiers there are 6 ski lift up to 2833m. There are 14 hotels and 21 restaurants, and together with neighbour municipality Sedrun, Disentis offers a total of 10,000 beds in hotels and holiday apartments.

Heritage sites of national significance
The Basilica of S. Gada, Disentis Abbey, the Chapel of S. Luzi in Disla, the Chapel of S. Maria in Acletta and the Punt Russein bridge (shared with Sumvitg) are listed as Swiss heritage sites of national significance.

Climate

Demographics
, 8.9% of the population was made up of foreign nationals. Over the last 10 years the population has decreased at a rate of -4.7%.

, the gender distribution of the population was 51.1% male and 48.9% female.  The age distribution, in Disentis/Mustér is; 219 children or 10.1% of the population are between 0 and 9 years old and 343 teenagers or 15.8% are between 10 and 19. Of the adult population, 207 people or 9.5% of the population are between 20 and 29 years old. 289 people or 13.3% are between 30 and 39, 316 people or 14.5% are between 40 and 49, and 272 people or 12.5% are between 50 and 59. The senior population distribution is 215 people or 9.9% of the population are between 60 and 69 years old, 169 people or 7.8% are between 70 and 79, there are 113 people or 5.2% who are between 80 and 89 there are 29 people or 1.3% who are between 90 and 99.

In the 2007 federal election the most popular party was the CVP which received 66.8% of the vote. The next three most popular parties were the SVP (17.4%), the SP (9.9%) and the FDP (5.3%).

The entire Swiss population is generally well educated. In Disentis/Mustér about 64.5% of the population (between age 25-64) have completed either non-mandatory upper secondary education or additional higher education (either university or a Fachhochschule).

Disentis/Mustér has an unemployment rate of 0.79%. , there were 107 people employed in the primary economic sector and about 43 businesses involved in this sector. 341 people are employed in the secondary sector and there are 29 businesses in this sector. 719 people are employed in the tertiary sector, with 102 businesses in this sector.

The historical population is given in the following table:

Religion
Of the rest of the population,  there are 8 individuals (or about 0.37% of the population) who belong to the Orthodox Church, and there are 5 individuals (or about 0.23% of the population) who belong to another Christian church. There are 16 (or about 0.74% of the population) who are Islamic. There are 6 individuals (or about 0.28% of the population) who belong to another church (not listed on the census), 42 (or about 1.93% of the population) belong to no church, are agnostic or atheist, and 67 individuals (or about 3.08% of the population) did not answer the question.

Transportation
The first of these is located at the junction of the Reichenau-Tamins–Disentis/Mustér line and the Furka Oberalp line, while the latter three are located to the west on the Furka Oberalp line.

References

External links

Official webpage of the municipality Disentis/Mustér 

 
Ski areas and resorts in Switzerland
Cultural property of national significance in Graubünden
Populated places on the Rhine